The National Community Boats Association (NCBA) is a waterway society, registered charity No. 1108993 and limited company No. 5331820, in the United Kingdom.

NCBA supports community boat projects and encourages more people to access the inland waterways of the UK. Its headquarters are at the Yorkshire Waterways Museum in Goole. The NCBA held a National Conference towards the end of 2008.

Member organisations
The association has over 100 member community boat projects, all over the UK.

Organisations which are members of the National Community Boats Association operate boats which are specially designed and equipped to cater for people with disabilities, with learning difficulties and learning disabilities, disadvantaged groups, people with special needs, people of all ages.

These organisations carry an estimated 250,000 passengers per year from the above-mentioned groups.

Membership list
Accessible Boating Association, Hampshire
Adam's Ark Project, Doncaster
Angel Community Canal Boat Trust, London ACCT Website
Baldwin Boat Trust, Leicester Website
BDN Guide Counties Narrowboat, Birmingham, West Midlands
Beauchamp Lodge Settlement, London Website
Birmingham City Council Youth Service Division
Bradford Out & About Barge Association, West Yorkshire Website
Brent Play Association, Wembley
Bromley Youth Trust, Kent
Camden Canals & Narrowboat Association CCNA Website

Canal Boat Adventure Project, Cheshire
Canal Boat Project CBP website
Care Afloat, Skelmersdale, Lancashire
Children's Activity & Recreational Projects, Wolverhampton
East Manchester Community Boat Project, Hyde EMCBP Website
Ethel Trust Community Barge, Sheffield ETCB Website
Gloucestershire Disabled Afloat Riverboats Trust Website
Hampshire County Council Youth Services
Heulwen Trust, Welshpool Website
Hillingdon Narrowboats Association, Middlesex HNA Website
Kensington Foundation, Blackpool 
Laburnum Boat Club, Hackney's Community Boating Project Website
London Narrow Boat Project, Luton, Bedfordshire
Maypole Community Boat Projects, Birmingham
Mosaic, Shaping Disability Services, Leicester
Nottingham Narrowboat Project
Open Lock Project Website
Oxfordshire Narrowboat Trust
Queen Elizabeth's Foundation for Disabled People, Leatherhead, Surrey
Reach Out Projects, Hertfordshire Website
Re-Union, Edinburgh Website
River Thames Boat Project, Kingston-upon-Thames RTBP Website
Rivertime Boat Trust (RBT), Maidenhead, Berkshire RBT Website
Safe Anchor Trust, Mirfield, West Yorkshire S.A.T Website
South Staffordshire Narrowboat Company Ltd, Wolverhampton Website
South West Herts Narrowboat Project, Hertfordshire Website
St Andrew's Methodist Youth Centre, Bristol
St John Ambulance, Northampton, and Nottinghamshire
Stockport Canal Boat Project SCBP Website
Surrey Care Trust Swingbridge Community Boat Programmes, Swingbridge Website 
Surrey County Council Outdoor Learning & Development, Surrey
Swansea Community Boat Trust SCBT Website
Thames & Kennet Narrowboat Trust, Wokingham, Berkshire Website
The Bruce Charitable Trust, Hungerford BCT Website
The Bruce Wake Charitable Trust, Rutland BWCT Website
The Canal Boat Project, Hertfordshire, and Harlow, Essex
The Kingfisher Medway Trust, Faversham, Kent KMT Website
The Lyneal Trust, Shrewsbury Website
The Pirate Club, London Website
The Seagull Trust, Ratho, Edinburgh Website
The Sobriety Project, Goole, East Riding of Yorkshire Website
The Wharf Narrowboat, Walsall
The Willow Trust, Cirencester, Gloucestershire
Tideway Adventurers Narrowboat Project, London TANP Website
Top Lock Training, Stockport TLT Website
Truman Enterprise Narrowboat Trust, Walsall TENT Website
Unity Enterprise, Govan, Scotland
Vale of Llangollen Canal Boat Trust, Llangollen, Clwyd, Wales VLCBT Website
Warwickshire Association of Youth Clubs Website
Waterstart, Goole
Waveney Stardust, Lowestoft, Suffolk Website
Wildside Activity Centre, Wolverhampton WAC Website
Wirral Community Narrowboat Trust, Ellesmere Port WCNT Website
Wooden Canal Boat Society

Training for community boat operators
NCBA also delivers training for the management of community boats.

The Certificate in Community Boat Management is a nationally accredited course for helmsmen and crew members working with people who are young, elderly, disadvantaged or disabled on Class A or B Waters.

Other courses: Basic Boat Handling; Complete Crew Course; Regional Training Moderator; Senior Trainer; CCBM Training Endorsement; and Additional Course Units.

Work with offenders and young persons
NCBA is operating two special projects:
 Y-AFLOAT - Involving young people in community boating
 Prisons Project - facilitating the reunion of offenders with their families

The UK Government's Department for Education and Skills awarded the National Community Boats Association an NVYO grant of £123,990 for youth work.

See also
List of waterway societies in the United Kingdom

References

External links
National Community Boat Association's website
British Waterways' own site: listing for National Community Boats Association
EUROPEAN UNION - NCBA a Partner in the EU's 'Eureauweb' Project, part of the European Waterways Tourism Development Service

Disabled boating
Charities based in Scotland
Waterways organisations in the United Kingdom